The Midwest Christian College Conference is a college athletic conference that is a member of the National Christian College Athletic Association (NCCAA) and the Association of Christian College Athletics (ACCA) in the United States.

Schools

Former members 
 Saint Louis Christian College
 Central Bible College
 Covenant College
 Grace University
 Nebraska Christian College
 Vennard College

Sports offered
The conference offers two sports for men's competition and two sports for women's competition. Both men's and women's basketball are sponsored in addition to men's soccer and women's volleyball.

Men's basketball 
     Year                  Conference Champion                   Tournament Champion                   Sportsmanship Award
   1962-63                     Manhattan                             Calvary
   1963-64                     Covenant                              Manhattan
   1964-65                     Calvary                               Omaha (Faith)
   1965-66                     Calvary                               Calvary
   1966-67                     Ozark                                 Ozark                                    Omaha (Faith)
   1967-68                     Ozark                                 Grace                                    Faith
   1968-69                     Ozark                                 Ozark                                    Calvary
   1969-70                     Grace                                 Grace                                    Faith/Grace
   1970-71                     Ozark                                 Grace                                    Central/Faith
   1971-72                     Faith/Grace                           Faith                                    Faith/Grace
   1972-73                     Friends (Barclay)                     Friends (Barclay)                        Faith
   1973-74                     Faith                                 Faith                                    Friends (Barclay)
   1974-75                     Faith                                 Manhattan                                Grace
   1975-76                     Faith/Grace                           Grace                                    Faith/Grace
   1976-77                     Faith                                 Faith                                    Central
   1977-78                     Grace                                 Grace                                    Central
   1978-79                     Calvary                               Friends (Barclay)                        Friends (Barclay)
   1979-80                     Calvary                               Manhattan                                Grace
   1980-81                     Calvary                               Calvary                                  Grace
   1981-82                     Calvary                               Calvary                                  Friends (Barclay)
   1982-83                     Calvary/Grace                         Grace                                    Calvary
   1983-84                     Grace                                 Grace                                    Grace
   1984-85                     Grace                                 Grace                                    Calvary
   1985-86                     Calvary                               Calvary                                  Calvary
   1986-87                     Friends (Barclay)                     Friends (Barclay)                        Faith
   1987-88                     Calvary                               Nebraska                                 Calvary
   1988-89                     Calvary                               Calvary                                  Grace
   1989-90                     Calvary                               Calvary                                  Grace
   1990-91                     Calvary                               Grace                                    Calvary
   1991-92                     Grace                                 Calvary                                  Grace
   1992-93                     Grace                                 Grace                                    Grace                                
   1993-94                     Grace                                 Grace                                    Grace 
   1994-95                     Grace/Nebraska                        Grace                                    Nebraska
   1995-96                     Nebraska                              Nebraska                                 Nebraska 
   1996-97                     Nebraska                              Manhattan                                Central
   1997-98                     Grace                                 Faith                                    Manhattan/Nebraska
   1998-99                     Manhattan                             Manhattan                                Grace
   1999-00                     Grace                                 Ozark                                    Ozark
   2000-01                     Manhattan/Ozark                       Ozark                                    Grace
   2001-02                     Manhattan                             Manhattan                                Grace/Ozark
   2002-03                     Manhattan                             Manhattan                                Grace
   2003-04                     Manhattan/Grace                       Grace                                    Grace
   2004-05                     Grace                                 Grace                                    Grace
   2005-06                     Manhattan/Ozark                       Grace                                    Vennard
   2006-07                     Grace/Manhattan                       Grace                                    Ozark
   2007-08                     Grace/Manhattan                       Manhattan                                Calvary
   2008-09                     Manhattan                             Manhattan                                Ozark
   2009-10                     Manhattan                             no tournament                            Calvary
   2010-11                     Ozark/Barclay/Manhattan               no tournament                            Manhattan
   2011-12                     Manhattan                             no tournament                            Ozark
   2012-13                     Manhattan                             Ozark                                    Ozark
   2013-14                     Manhattan                             Manhattan                                Faith
   2014-15                     Faith                                 Faith                                    Ozark/Faith
   2015-16                     Barclay                               Manhattan                                Faith
   2016-17                     Manhattan                             Manhattan                                Ozark
  
          ALL CONFERENCE TEAMS
  1964-65     Rathburn       Omaha (Faith)
              Collins        Omaha (Faith)
              Dewald         Calvary
              Person         Calvary
              Kidd           Manhattan
              Pemberton      Calvary

  1965-66     Lowe   MVP     Calvary
              Hyllberg       Central Bible
              Rathburn       Omaha (Faith)
              Edwards        Manhattan
              Bauerfeld      Calvary
              Stein          Central Christian

  1966-67     Stein   MVP    Central Christian
              Edwards        Manhattan
              Pemberton      Calvary
              Robinson       Ozark
              McPeck         Ozark

  1967-68

  `968-69    Ensz   CO-MVP   Grace
             Sharp  CO-MVP   Ozark

  1969-70    VanDeusen  MVP  Manhattan
             Sharp           Ozark
             Ensz            Grace
             Wilson          Manhattan
             Reimer          Grace

  1970-71    Sharp  MVP      Ozark
             Stauffer        Ozark
             Thompson        Faith
             Wiebe           Grace
             Reimer          Grace

  1971-72   Reimer   MVP     Grace
            Farlow           Faith
            Thompson         Faith
            Hardee           Calvary
            Pratt            Manhattan

  1972-73   Farlow   MVP     Faith
            Theolbald        Manhattan
            Westby           Grace
            Nickel           Grace

  1973-74   Nickel     MVP   Grace
            Smith            Friends (Barclay)
            Lanzen           Faith
            Tucker           Friends (Barclay)
            Westby           Grace

  1974-75   Nickel    MVP    Grace
            Theobald         Manhattan
            Lanzen           Faith
            Boswell          Friends (Barclay)
            Mallette         Central Christian

  1975-76   Theobald   MVP   Manhattan
            Wiens            Grace
            Townsend         Faith
            Lanzen           Faith
            Harder           Grace

  1976-77   

  1977-78   Lahm    MVP      Nebraska
            Wymer            Faith
            Sprouls          Manhattan
            Guhr             Grace
            Talyor           Manhattan 

  1978-79   Bohall   MVP     Nebraska
            Wymer            Faith  
            Powers           Friends (Barclay)
            Nolen            Friends (Barclay)
            Schneeberger     Calvary

  1979-80   Schneeberger MVP Calvary
            Lahm             Nebraska
            Jefferson        Faith
            S. Dick          Grace
            Entz             Grace

  1980-81   Schneeberger MVP Calvary
            Burton           Central
            Boettcher        Friends (Barclay)
            Ferneau          Central
            Sailer           Calvary

  1981-82   Burton    MVP    Central
            Schneeberger     Calvary
            Painter          Calvary
            Ferneau          Central
            Sperling         Grace

  1982-83   Dalton   MVP     Calvary
            Rucker           Central
            Thiessen         Grace
            Thompson         Faith
            Helten           Faith

  `983-84   Nachtigal  MVP   Grace
            Chitwood         Nebraska
            White            Friends (Barclay)
            Wagner           Grace
            Thompson         Faith

  1984-85   Christenson MVP  Friends (Barclay)
            Nachtigal        Grace
            Davis            Friends (Barclay)
            Wagner           Grace
            Spicer           Calvary

  1985-86   Wagner    MVP    Grace
            Davis            Friends (Barclay)
            Justice          Nebraska
            Betz             Faith'
            Smith            Calvary

  1986-87   Dixon   CO-MVP   Calvary
            Christenson CO-MVP Friends (Barclay)
            Betz              Faith
            Classen           Grace
            Davis             Friends (Barclay)
            Justice           Nebraska

  1987-88   Dixon     MVP     Calvary
            Davis             Friends (Barclay)
            Classen           Grace
            Ballard           Faith
            Miratsky          Grace

  1988-89   Classen  CO-MVP   Grace
            Ballard  CO-MVP   Faith
            Loewer            Calvary
            Ballard           Nebraska
            Miratsky          Grace

  1989-90   Classen   MVP     Grace
            Loewer            Calvary
            Kissack           Nebraska
            Steelman          Manhattan
            Roher             Friends (Barclay)
            Miratsky          Grace

  1990-91   Roher    MVP      Friends (Barclay)
            Millermon         Calvary
            Loewer            Calvary
            Ridpath           Nebraska
            Steelman          Manhattan

  1991-92   Kissack   MVP     Nebraska
            Loewer            Calvary
            Widman            Grace
            Smith             Grace
            Liebenthal        Grace

  1992-93   Smith     MVP     Grace
            Renner            Manhattan
            Liebenthal        Grace
            Widman            Grace
            Head              Calvary

  1993-94   Liebenthal  MVP   Grace
            Eubanks           Manhattan
            Evans             Nebraska
            Terpstra          Faith

  1994-95   Isaacs     MVP    Manhattan
            Evans             Nebraska
a           Beckenhauer       Nebraska
            Nanniga           Grace
            Terpstra          Faith

  1995-96   Beckenhauer  MVP  Nebraska
            Isaacs            Manhattan
            Bazil             Manhattan
            Mattox            Grace
            Terpstra          Faith

  1996-97   Bazil     MVP     Manhattan
            Olsen             Nebraska
            Wilson            Grace
            Beckenhauer       Nebraska
            Terpstra          Faith

  1997-98   Wilson   CO-MVP   Grace
            Olsen    CO-MVP   Nebraska
            Easley            Central
            Schmidt           Grace
            Van Donge         Manhattan

  1998-99   Olsen    MVP      Nebraska
            Wilson            Grace
            VAn Donge         Manhattan
            Hahn              Manhattan
            Schmidt           Grace

  1999-00   Tarlton   MVP     Ozark
            Hahn              Manhattan
            Jordon            Grace
            Renfro            Nebraska
            Bredeholf         Nebraska

  2000-01   Jordon     MVP    Grace
            Martens           Manhattan
            Turner            Ozark
            Courter           Manhattan
            Bates             Manhattan
            Busenitz          Calvary

  2001-02   Martens    MVP    Manhattan
            Jordon            Grace
            Kluttz            Manhattan
            Aderson           Ozark
            Stoker            Nebraska

Volleyball 
   Year                     Conference Champion                  Tournament Champion
   1977                                                                Faith
   1978                                                                Faith
   1979                                                                Friends (Barclay)
   1980                                                                Grace
   1981                                                                Friends (Barclay)
   1982                                                                Calvary
   1983                                                                Grace
   1984                        Faith                                   Faith
   1985                        Grace                                   Grace
   1986                        Grace                                   Grace
   1987                        Faith                                   Faith
   1988                        Calvary/Grace                           Calvary
   1989                        Calvary                                 Calvary
   1990                        Calvary                                 Calvary
   1991                        Calvary/Manhattan                       Calvary
   1992                        Faith                                   Manhattan
   1993                        Manhattan                               Manhattan
   1994                        Faith                                   Faith
   1995                        Faith                                   Faith
   1996                        Faith                                   Faith
   1997                        Grace                                   Faith
   1998                        Faith                                   Faith
   1999                        Manhattan                               Manhattan
   2000                        Ozark                                   Ozark
   2001                        Ozark                                   Grace
   2002                        Nebraska                                Nebraska
   2003                        Nebraska/Ozark                          Ozark
   2004                        Grace                                   Ozark
   2005                        Grace                                   Grace
   2006                        Grace                                   Grace
   2007                        Grace                                   Grace
   2008                        Manhattan                               Manhattan
   2009                        Manhattan                               no tournament
   2010                        Ozark                                   no tournament
   2011                        Ozark                                   no tournament
   2012                        Manhattan                               Manhattan
   2013                        Manhattan                               Manhattan
   2014                        Ozark                                   Ozark
   2015                        Manhattan                               Manhattan
   2016                        Manhattan                               Ozark
   2017                        Emmaus                                  Emmaus
   2018                        Emmaus                                  Emmaus
   2019                        Manhattan                               Manhattan
   2020                        Manhattan                               Manhattan
   2021                        Manhattan                               Manhattan

Women's basketball 
   Year                   Conference Champion                  Tournament Champion
   1989                         Calvary
   1990                         Calvary/Faith
   1991                         Faith
   1992                         Grace                                
   1993                         Grace                                  Grace
   1994                         Grace                                  Grace
   1995                         Grace                                  Calvary
   1996                         Grace                                  Grace
   1997                         Faith                                  Faith
   1998                         Faith                                  Grace
   1999                         Faith                                  Nebraska
   2000                         Manhattan                              Ozark
   2001                         Ozark                                  Grace
   2002                         Ozark                                  Manhattan
   2003                         Manhattan                              Ozark
   2004                         Manhattan                              Ozark
   2005                         Manhattan                              Manhattan
   2006                         Manhattan                              Manhattan
   2007                         Manhattan                              Ozark
   2008                         Ozark                                  Ozark
   2009                         Manhattan                              Manhattan
   2010                         Manhattan                              no tournament
   2011                         Manhattan                              no tournament
   2012                         Central                                no tournament
   2013                         Manhattan                              Manhattan
   2014                         Manhattan                              Manhattan
   2015                         Central                                Central
   2016                         Emmaus                                 Emmaus
   2017                         Emmaus                                 Emmaus
   2018                         Manhattan                              Manhattan
   2019                         Emmaus                                 Emmaus

Men's soccer 
   Year                     Conference Champion                  Tournament Champion
   1990                         Manhattan                             Calvary
   1991                         Manhattan                             Manhattan
   1992                         Manhattan                             Manhattan
   1993                         Manhattan                             Calvary
   1994                         Manhattan                             Manhattan
   1995                         Faith/Manhattan                       Manhattan
   1996                         Faith/Manhattan                       Manhattan
   1997                         Barclay                               Barclay
   1998                         Manhattan                             Manhattan'
   1999                         Manhattan                             Barclay/Manhattan
   2000                         Manhattan                             Barclay
   2001                         Ozark                                 Manhattan
   2002                         Grace                                 Manhattan
   2003                         Manhattan                             Manhattan
   2004
   2005
   2006
   2007
   2008                        Manhattan                              Manhattan
   2009                        Manhattan                              no tournament
   2010                        Manhattan                              no tournament
   2011                        Manhattan                              no tournament
   2012                        Manhattan                              no tournament
   2013                        Barclay/Manhattan/Ozark                Manhattan
   2014                        Barclay                                Barclay
   2015                        Ozark                                  Manhattan
   2016                        Ozark                                  Ozark
   2017                        Manhattan                              Manhattan
   2018                        Emmaus                                 Emmaus
   2019                        Manhattan                              Manhattan
   2020                        Manhattan                              Manhattan
   2021                        Manhattan                              Manhattan
   2022                        Manhattan                              Faith

References

External links
 Midwest Christian College Conference official website

 
Association of Christian College Athletics member schools
College sports conferences in the United States